Ain't Supposed to Die a Natural Death is a 1971 album by Melvin Van Peebles, featuring mostly spoken word poetry over music written by Van Peebles. Some of its material was used in later projects such as the stage musical of the same name and Sweet Sweetback's Baadasssss Song. Note that this is an album of original material, not to be confused with the soundtrack LP released for the musical itself.

Track listing
All music and words by Melvin Van Peebles

Side One
"Three Boxes of Longs Please"
"You Ain't No Astronaut"
"Come On Feet Do Your Thing"
"Funky Girl On Motherless Broadway"
"Put a Curse On You"

Side Two
"I Got The Blood"
"You Gotta Be Holdin Out Five Dollars On Me"
"Heh Heh (Chuckle) Good Morning sunshine"
"Salamaggi's Birthday"

Personnel
 Melvin Van Peebles - Vocals
 Warren Smith - Drums, Percussion
 Bross Townsend - Piano, Organ, Electric Harpsichord
 Herb Bushler - Bass, Electric Bass, Violin, Tambourine
Carl Lynch - Guitar, Bass Guitar
Nat Woodward - Trumpet, Cornet
 Al Gibbons, George Barrow - Tenor Saxophone, Soprano Saxophone
 Howard Johnson - Baritone Saxophone, Flugelhorn, Tuba
 Gene Radice - Engineer
 Produced and Conceived by Melvin Van Peebles
 Arranged and Conducted by Warren Smith
 All words and music by Melvin Van Peebles, ASCAP, Almo Music Corp.
 Art Director: Tom Wikes
 Photography: Jim McCrary

Notes 

1970 albums
Melvin Van Peebles albums
A&M Records albums